Pseudovesicaria is a genus of flowering plants belonging to the family Brassicaceae.

Its native range is Northwestern Balkan Peninsula, Caucasus.

Species:
 Pseudovesicaria digitata (C.A.Mey.) Rupr.

References

Brassicaceae
Brassicaceae genera